is a city in Miyazaki Prefecture, Japan. The city was founded on April 1, 1924. As of June 1, 2019, the city has an estimated population of 161,137, with 70,549 households and a population density of 247 per km2. The total area is 653.36 km2 making it the largest city in the prefecture in terms of area.

History
Miyakonojō is known as the birthplace of the Shimazu Estate, the largest shōen (estate or manor) of medieval Japan. In the 1020s, a powerful official named Taira no Suemoto developed a small manor named Shimazu-in. Expanded substantially in the first half of the 12th century, it eventually covered large portions of Satsuma, Ōsumi and Hyūga Provinces. In 1185, Koremune no Tadahisa was appointed as jitō of the Shimazu Estate and thereafter claimed the clan name of Shimazu. It is said that one of Tadahisa's residences, called Iwayoshi Gosho, was located at Miyakonojō. Between the Muromachi period and Edo period, the Hōngō family, which was a branch family of the Shimazus, controlled the area. After the Boshin War, it became one of the cities to abolish the han system. In 1871, it became a prefecture for a year. On January 1, 2006, the towns of Takajō, Takazaki, Yamada and Yamanokuchi (all from Kitamorokata District) were merged into Miyakonojō.

Geography

Climate
Miyakonojō has a humid subtropical climate (Köppen climate classification Cfa), but is cooler than other cities in Miyazaki. The area's climate is influenced by its proximity to mountains.

Neighboring municipalities 
Miyazaki Prefecture
Miyazaki
Nichinan
Kobayashi
Kushima
Mimata
Takaharu
Kagoshima Prefecture
Soo
Kirishima
Shibushi

Demographics
Per Japanese census data, the population of Miyakonojō in 2020 is 160,640 people. Miyakonojō has been conducting censuses since 1920.

Industry
Many of Miyakonojō's citizens work as farmers. They produce gobō, meat, and bell peppers.  Miyakonojō is also home to some agriculture-related manufacturing.

Miyakonojō is also famous for producing traditional Japanese archery bows from the abundant bamboo in the area.

Education

Schools
Miyakonojō has 35 elementary schools and 19 junior high schools.

Notable residents
Tomoji Tanabe, the world's oldest man 1895–2009, was born and lived in Miyakonojō.
Kōsei Inoue, Olympic Gold Medalist in Judo.
Gōgen Yamaguchi, known as "The Cat", was a renowned martial arts master of the Gōjū-ryū style of Karate.
Jūzō Yamasaki, the manga artist was born in Miyakonojō.
Hideo Higashikokubaru, a famous comedian and the former Governor of Miyazaki.
Yuya Yanagi, a professional baseball player for the Chunichi Dragons.
Masatoshi Nagase, actor.

Current issues
Miyakonojō is experiencing a declining population. Several other cities in Miyazaki Prefecture are also facing this problem. Many schools are scheduled to close due to the declining population, which has resulted in fewer children.

References

External links 

 

Cities in Miyazaki Prefecture